Rubidium silver iodide is a ternary inorganic compound with the formula RbAg4I5. Its conductivity involves the movement of silver ions within the crystal lattice. It was discovered while searching for chemicals which had the ionic conductivity properties of alpha-phase silver iodide at temperatures below 146 °C for AgI.

RbAg4I5 can be formed by melting together or grinding together stoichiometric quantities of rubidium iodide and silver(I) iodide. The reported conductivity is 25 siemens per metre (that is a 1×1×10 mm bar would have a resistance of 400 ohms along the long axis).

The crystal structure is composed of sets of iodine tetrahedra; they share faces through which the silver ions diffuse.

RbAg4I5 was proposed around 1970 as a solid electrolyte for batteries, and has been used in conjunction with electrodes of silver and of RbI3.  Its conductivity does not exhibit substantial variation with changes in relative humidity.

Rubidium silver iodide family is a group of compounds and solid solutions that are isostructural with the RbAg4I5 alpha modification. Examples of such advanced superionic conductors with mobile Ag+ and Cu+ cations include KAg4I5, NH4Ag4I5, K1−xCsxAg4I5, Rb1−xCsxAg4I5, CsAg4Br1−xI2+x, CsAg4ClBr2I2, CsAg4Cl3I2, RbCu4Cl3I2 and KCu4I5.

References

Metal halides
Iodides
Rubidium compounds
Silver compounds
Alkali metal iodides